The 1904–05 Yale Bulldogs men's ice hockey season was the 10th season of play for the program.

Season
Yale played a majority of their games at home for the first time in four years. Yale did not play any team from the Pittsburgh area for the first time since 1898 due to the collapse of the Western Pennsylvania Hockey League.

Yale entered the final game of its season with the opportunity to win the intercollegiate championship, however, Harvard once again stymied the Elis.

The team did not have a coach, however, Charles Goodyear II (the son of business magnate Charles W. Goodyear) served as team manager.

Roster

Standings

Schedule and Results

|-
!colspan=12 style="color:white; background:#00356B" | Regular Season

References

Yale Bulldogs men's ice hockey seasons
Yale
Yale
Yale
Yale